The rivière au Saumon (English: Salmon River) is a tributary of the Saint-Jean River, flowing in the unorganized territory of Lac-Jérôme, in the Minganie Regional County Municipality, in the administrative region of Côte-Nord, in the province of Quebec in Canada.

Forestry is the main economic activity in this valley.

Geography 
The salmon river draws its source at the mouth of a small lake in the unorganized territory of Lac-Jérôme. The mouth of this lake is located at:
  north-west of the village center of Havre-Saint-Pierre;
  north-west of the mouth of the Saint John River;
  north-west of the mouth of the Salmon river.

Upper course of the salmon river (segment of )

  first south to the outlet (coming from the southwest) of two lakes; then south-east to the lake ?; then south across the lake?, to its mouth.
  first towards the south-east, crossing a small triangular lake at the end of the segment, to its mouth;
Note: this lake receives 5 lake discharges, the largest of which comes from the south;

Lower course of the salmon river (segment of )

  towards the south-east by collecting the discharge (coming from the north) of Lake Esnault and the discharge (coming from the southwest) of a set of lakes, up to the discharge (from the northwest) of Lac Douayren;
  towards the east in a deep valley, forming a loop towards the north, then curving towards the south-east, until its mouth.

The Salmon River flows on the west bank of the Saint-Jean River, about halfway between the southern limit of Labrador and the north shore of the Gulf of Saint Lawrence. This confluence is located at:

  north-west of the village center of Mingan;
  north of the mouth of the Saint-Jean river (i.e. near the village of Rivière-Saint-Jean);
  west of Manitou Lake which is part of the hydrographic side of the Mingan River.

Toponymy 
The toponym "rivière au Saumon" was formalized on December 5, 1968, at the Place Names Bank of the Commission de toponymie du Québec.

See also 

 List of rivers of Quebec

References 

Rivers of Côte-Nord
Minganie Regional County Municipality